The Minister for Employment is a Danish minister office. The minister is the labour minister of Denmark and is the political head of the Ministry of Employment of Denmark.

The office was introduced with the Scavenius Cabinet on 9 November 1942. It was called Minister for Labour until 2001.

List of ministers
Source:

References

External links 

Lists of government ministers of Denmark
Government ministerial offices of Denmark